O'Reilly is a common Irish surname. The O'Reillys were historically the kings of East Bréifne in what is today County Cavan. The clan were part of the Connachta's Uí Briúin Bréifne kindred and were closely related to the Ó Ruairc (O'Rourkes) of West Bréifne. O'Reilly is ranked tenth in the top twenty list of most common Irish surnames. It is also the patronymic form of the Irish name Reilly. The name is commonly found throughout Ireland, with the greatest concentration of the surname found in County Cavan followed by Longford, Meath, Westmeath, Fermanagh and Monaghan, and the Province of Leinster.

Naming conventions

Overview

Usually anglicised as Reilly, O'Reilly or Riley, the original form of the name, Ó Raghallaigh, denotes "from/of Raghallach", the name Raghallach thought to be derived from the compounds ragh (meaning "race") and ceallach (meaning "sociable").

The Ó Raghallaigh family were part of the Connachta, with the eponymous Raghallach said to have died at the Battle of Clontarf in 1014. The family became the kings of East Breifne, modern-day County Cavan and County Longford.

The name is common and widespread throughout Ireland, ranked 11th most common in 1890 and in 1997.

A self-proclaimed and disputed O'Reilly Clan Chieftain to this day is at odds with the O'Rourke Clan Chieftain because he contests the recognised O'Rourke claim on the title Prince of Breifne. This was settled in 1994 when the Chief Herald of Ireland made the O'Rourke Chief the Prince of Breifne, but the Office of the Chief Herald stopped granting courtesy titles to Gaelic Chiefs in 2003 (see O'Rourke).

People

O'Reilly
People with the surname O'Reilly include:

 Alejandro O'Reilly (1722–1794), second Spanish governor of colonial Louisiana
 Andreas O'Reilly (1742–1832), Irish-born Austrian general
 Bernard O'Reilly (1903–1975), Australian author, found the wreck of a Stinson aircraft in the McPherson Range, 1937
 Bernard O'Reilly (bishop of Hartford) (1803–1856), Irish Roman Catholic bishop
 Bernard O'Reilly (bishop of Liverpool) (1824–1894), Irish Roman Catholic bishop
 Bill O'Reilly (born 1949), American commentator and television show host of The O'Reilly Factor on the Fox News Channel
 Bill O'Reilly, Australian cricketer
 Bob O'Reilly, Australian rugby league footballer
 Caitriona O'Reilly, Irish poet and critic
 Cal O'Reilly, Canadian ice hockey player
 Cameron O'Reilly, Irish and Australian businessman
 Cassia O'Reilly, Irish singer-songwriter
 Charles O'Reilly (died 1800), Roman Catholic Bishop of Kilmore from 1798 to 1800
 Danny O'Reilly, lead singer of Irish band, The Coronas
 David O'Reilly, several people
 Dermot O'Reilly (1942–2007), Irish-born Canadian singer and songwriter in band Ryan's Fancy, working in Newfoundland and Labrador
 Des O'Reilly (1954–2016), Australian rugby league player
 Eugenia O'Reilly-Regueiro, Mexican mathematician
 Emily O'Reilly, Irish journalist
 Emma O'Reilly, Irish physiotherapist and cycling soigneur who worked for Lance Armstrong
 Finbarr O'Reilly, Canadian photographer
 Gary O'Reilly, English footballer
 Genevieve O'Reilly, Irish actress
 Heather O'Reilly (born 1985), American soccer player
 Hugh Reily (1630–1695), Irish M.P. and political author
 James Reilly (Canadian politician) (1835–1909), Canadian businessman and politician from Alberta
 James O'Reilly, American Roman Catholic priest
 Jennifer O'Reilly (1943–2016), medieval historian of Britain and Ireland
 Jenny Quinn O'Reilly (1762–1802), in baptism Evgenia Ivanovna Vyazemskaya, Irish-born lady and second wife of Prince Andrey Vyazemsky, mother of the Russian Imperial poet Pyotr Vyazemsky
 Joe O'Reilly, Irish politician
 John Reyly (recte O'Reilly) (c. 1646–1717), M.P. for Cavan County in the Parliament of Ireland of 1689
 John O'Reilly (born 1940), Canadian politician from Ontario
 Kyle O'Reilly (born 1987), ring name of Canadian professional wrestler Kyle Greenwood
 Leonora O'Reilly, American feminist
 Luke O'Reilly (disambiguation), several people
 Mary Margaret O'Reilly, Assistant Director of the United States Bureau of the Mint from 1924 to 1938
 Matthew O'Reilly, Irish politician and farmer 
 O'Reilly, Lords of Bréifne (c. 1161 – 1607), Irish rulers
 Patrick Thomas O'Reilly (1833–1892), U.S. Catholic bishop, born in Ireland
 Peter O'Reilly (civil servant) (1827–1905), Irish-born settler and official in the Colony of British Columbia
 Peter O'Reilly (hurler) (1902–1940), Irish hurler
 Philip O'Reilly (Cavan County MP) (c. 1600–1655), M.P. for County Cavan 
 Philip Og O'Reilly (c. 1640 – 1703), M.P. for Cavan Borough in the Parliament of Ireland of 1689
 Philip Reyley (recte O'Reilly) (c. 1630 – after 1689), M.P. for Cavan County in the Parliament of Ireland of 1689
 Randall C. O'Reilly (born 1967), American professor of psychology, developer of Leabra
 Robert O'Reilly (born 1950), American actor
 Ruth O'Reilly (born 1981), Irish rugby union player
 Ryan O'Reilly (ice hockey) (born 1991), Canadian ice hockey player
 Ryan O'Reilly (wrestler) (born 1980), American professional wrestler
 Samuel O'Reilly (1854–1909), American tattoo artist and inventor
 Stephen O'Reilly (born 1964) (better known as Stephen Egerton), American musician
 Stephen O'Reilly, American actor
 Stephen O'Reilly, Australian footballer
 Terry O'Reilly, Canadian hockey player
 Tom O'Reilly (1915–1995), Irish Fianna Fáil politician
 Tim O'Reilly (born 1954), Irish-American founder of O'Reilly Media
 Tom O'Reilly (1915–1995), Irish Gaelic footballer and politician
 Tom O'Reilly, Irish Sinn Féin politician
Tom O'Reilly, Papua New Guinea international
 Tony O'Reilly (born 1936), Irish businessman
 Valli O'Reilly, American makeup artist
 Walter Cresswell O'Reilly (1877–1954), Australian Commonwealth Film Censor and founding President of the National Trust of Australia

O'Riley
 Bunny Wailer (1947–2021), Jamaican reggae musician sometimes known as Bunny O'Riley
 Christopher O'Riley (born 1956), American classical pianist and public radio show host
 Don O'Riley (1945–1997), American Major League Baseball pitcher
 Jon Riley (1824–1879), US army deserter also known as John O'Riley
 Matt O'Riley (born 2000), English footballer at Celtic F.C.

Riley

Fictional character 
 Mr. O'Reilly, portrayed by the Irish actor David Kelly in the Fawlty Towers episode "The Builders"
 Aloysius Umbongo N'Danga O'Reilly, in the song "Baguette Dilemma for the Booker Prize Guy" by the band Half Man Half Biscuit on their 2014 album Urge for Offal
Corporal Walter "Radar" O'Reilly, in the M*A*S*H media franchise

Other uses

 O'Reilly Auto Parts, an American chain of automotive supply stores
 O'Reilly Media (formerly O'Reilly & Associates), an American media company
 Baba O'Riley, a song by The Who

See also 
 Riley (disambiguation)
 Ryley (name)
 Riley (surname)

References

External links

The O'Reilly Clan
O'Reilly family pedigree at Library Ireland
Statistics about O'Reilly Ancestors
O'Reilly, Reilly, Riley. History of family
Irish Times surname entry for "Riley"
The Irish O'Reilly family and their connections to Austria and Russia by Stefan M. Newerkla

Irish families
Surnames of Irish origin
Anglicised Irish-language surnames
English-language surnames
Patronymic surnames